Canarias Regional Air was a Spanish charter airline based in Santa Cruz de Tenerife, Canary Islands.

Company history
Canarias Regional Air was founded in 1998 in an effort to compete with Binter —a subsidiary of Iberia. It began operations from Tenerife North Airport. Canarias Regional Air had an association with Air Europa Express —a now defunct subsidiary of Air Europa— for the operation of a number of British Aerospace ATP turboprop aircraft in short-haul flights between the islands.

The company tried to operate as an independent airline after the agreement with Air Europa Express expired but the venture was not successful.
Canarias Regional Air ceased operations in 2000, shortly after an attempt at operating charter flights with a newly acquired Boeing 737.

Fleet
10 BAe ATP 
1 Boeing 737-300

See also
List of defunct airlines of Spain

References

External links

Canarias Regional Air logo
El Economista; La aviación española ve cómo cierran 43 compañías aéreas en los últimos 25 años

Defunct airlines of Spain
Airlines established in 1998
Airlines disestablished in 2000
Transport in the Canary Islands